Oskar Gasecki (born 28 October 1990) is a Polish footballer who plays as a defender.

Career

College and amateur
Gasecki played two years of college soccer at Western Illinois University, before signing with German club Borussia Dortmund to play for their reserve team.

Professional
On January 20, 2015, it was announced that Gasecki had signed with USL club Saint Louis FC.

References

1990 births
Living people
Polish footballers
Western Illinois Leathernecks men's soccer players
Polish expatriate footballers
Borussia Dortmund II players
Saint Louis FC players
Expatriate soccer players in the United States
USL Championship players
Soccer players from Illinois
People from Louis Trichardt
Association football defenders
Soccer players from Limpopo